Sweetback is an English band composed of members from the band Sade, not including the frontwoman Sade Adu. They are a jazz/funk band with R&B overtones. Stuart Matthewman, Paul Denman and Andrew Hale had been recording with female vocalist Sade Adu since 1984. The group Sweetback formed in 1994 at the conclusion of Sade's Love Deluxe World Tour. Their albums feature a host of guest vocalists such as Leroy Osbourne, Amel Larrieux, Maxwell, Aya (Lysa Aya Trenier), Bahamadia, Chocolate Genius, and El Debarge.

Members
Stuart Matthewman (guitar, saxophone)
Paul Spencer Denman (bass, drum machine)
Andrew Hale (piano, keyboards)

Discography

Albums
Sweetback (1996, Epic/Sony)
Stage 2 (2004, Epic/Sony)

Singles
"Softly, Softly" (1996)
"You Will Rise" (1997, Epic/Sony)
"Au Natural" (1997, Epic/Sony)
"Lover" (2004, Epic/Sony)
"Things You'll Never Know" (2004, Epic/Sony)

Videos
"You Will Rise" (1997)
"Lover" (2004)
"Things You'll Never Know" (2004)

References

Further reading

External links
Sweetback at Sony Music
http://members.tripod.com/topcat3sh/id28.htm

English jazz ensembles
English funk musical groups
British contemporary R&B musical groups
English pop music groups
Musical groups established in 1994
Sade (band)